Aeneas Ranald MacDonell, CBE, 11th Lord MacDonell, 21st Chief of Glengarry, (1875–1941) was a British diplomat.

Ranald was born in Chelsea.  His father worked for the New Zealand Midland Railway Company. He attended St Paul's School, London but showed little academic promise.

In December 1917 he was given the rank of Major and attached to the British military mission in Tbilisi. In the chaos of the time he took a 36-hour train journey there from Baku.

Publications

References

British diplomats
1875 births
1946 deaths
Scottish soldiers